Al Hill (July 14, 1892 – July 14, 1954) was an American film character actor who appeared in over 320 films between 1927 and 1954, including the 1951 film The Girl on the Bridge. Hill died in 1954 on his 62nd birthday.

Partial filmography

 Me, Gangster (1928)
 Stool Pigeon (1928)
 Alibi (1929)
 The Racketeer (1929)
 Little Caesar (1931) (uncredited)
 Ten Cents a Dance (1931)
 Corsair (1931)
 A Fool's Advice (1932)
 The Last Mile (1932)
 Night After Night (1932)
 The Death Kiss (1932)
 She Done Him Wrong (1933) (uncredited)
 Picture Brides (1933)
 Punch Drunks (1934)
 The Personality Kid (1934)
 Name the Woman (1934)
 Men of the Night (1934)
 Buried Loot (1935)
 The Payoff (1935)
 Riffraff (1936)
 The Border Patrolman (1936)
 Motor Madness (1937)
 Kid Galahad (1937) (uncredited)
 The Big Shot (1937)
 San Quentin (1937) as Convict
 Stage Door (1937) (uncredited)
 Boys Town (1938) (uncredited)
 Angels with Dirty Faces (1938) (uncredited)
 The Roaring Twenties (1939) as Ex-Con (uncredited)
 The Bank Dick (1940)
 Lucky Jordan (1942)
 Tramp, Tramp, Tramp (1942)
 Random Harvest (1942) (uncredited)
 A Man's World (1942)
 Knock on Any Door (1949) (uncredited)
 The Girl on the Bridge (1951)
 Run for the Hills (1953)
 A Star Is Born (1954) (uncredited)

References

External links 

1892 births
1954 deaths
American male film actors
American male silent film actors
Male actors from New York City
20th-century American male actors